Billy Constable (March 23, 1959 – August 22, 2015) was an Appalachian musician from Spruce Pine, North Carolina, best known for his three-finger-picking banjo technique and his vigorous acoustic guitar leads. He came from a rich musical background and from a young age started performing with bluegrass greats, including Charlie Moore, Josh Graves, the Doug Dillard Band, Kenny Baker and Vassar Clements. Constable has remained a key player in the Appalachian and bluegrass music scenes for several decades.

Constable developed a seizure disorder in 2011, found to be the result of a brain tumor which was surgically removed. His cancer later progressed, and he died peacefully on August 22, 2015.

Career

Constable grew up playing music as a part of the Wiseman family from western North Carolina. He began his professional career playing guitar with his mother's husband, the accomplished bluegrass musician Charlie Moore. As a teenager, he found work touring with Doug Dillard. He later moved to California to play with family band the Constables.

Despite his equable bluegrass roots, Constable proved himself to be a versatile musician as the years went on. He worked repeatedly in more electric and psychedelic settings with Jam bands Leftover Salmon and String Cheese Incident. During his tenure with Hypnotic Clambake, he was found playing everything from polkas to reggae to Bulgarian music. The Blueridge National Heritage Area states on their website that Constable's banjo playing "can be deceptively eclectic. His influences begin at home and with his family, but Billy's repertoire is vast, and he is comfortable in most musical situations."

Constable played regularly with mandolinist Mark Schimick, the Big Daddy Bluegrass Band, and guitarist Larry Keel. He often performed around Boone or Asheville, not far from where he grew up in western North Carolina. He played an active role in the music scene around many parts of Appalachia.

References

External links
 Official website

1959 births
2015 deaths
Musicians from Appalachia
Bluegrass musicians from North Carolina
Guitarists from North Carolina
American bluegrass guitarists
American male guitarists
20th-century American guitarists
People from Avery County, North Carolina
People from Spruce Pine, North Carolina
Country musicians from North Carolina
20th-century American male musicians
Hypnotic Clambake members
Leftover Salmon members